Breck School is an independent college-preparatory preK–12 school in Golden Valley, Minnesota, a suburb of Minneapolis.  It was founded in 1886 and is affiliated with the Episcopal Church. The school includes a Lower School consisting of grades preschool through four, a Middle School consisting of grades five through eight, and an Upper School consisting of grades nine through twelve. Breck School is accredited by the National Association of Independent Schools.

History

Breck was established in 1886 in Wilder, Minnesota and named after Episcopal missionary the Rev. James Lloyd Breck. The school moved to 2095 Commonwealth Ave in Saint Paul under the direction of the Rev. Charles Haupt, in 1916. In 1920 it moved to 2102 Carter Ave., just a few blocks away in Saint Anthony Park. Then, in the fall of 1922 it moved a few more blocks west to Como and Hendon (now a part of the Luther Seminary). In 1938, the school became an exclusively boys' school, and military curriculum was added. This military aspect was eliminated in 1959. Girls were reintroduced in 1952 in grades one to three, and eventually throughout the school in 1967. A fire destroyed the original Chapel of the Holy Spirit at the school's River Road location in Minneapolis in 1979. In 1981, the school moved to its present location in Golden Valley at the campus of that city's former middle and high school, which were closed after a school district merger. Breck celebrated its centennial in 1986. That same year, John C. Littleford was succeeded by interim headmaster Kathryn C. Harper. Sam Salas served as headmaster from 1987 until retiring in June 2007. Edward Kim succeeded Salas as Head of School in July 2007. In January 2017, Natalia Rico Hernández was named 16th Head of School, beginning her tenure in July 2017.

Language programs
Breck School has an established language program. Breck's language programs, including Spanish, French, and Mandarin, extend from preschool to 12th grade. The Mandarin Chinese program was created by Margaret Wong.

Community involvement

2008 U.S. Senate debate
On Saturday, October 11, 2008, Breck hosted the second debate between U.S. Senate candidates Republican Norm Coleman, Democrat Al Franken, and Independence Party candidate Dean Barkley. The debate was aired locally on KARE-11 TV and nationally on C-SPAN. Several hundred local community members watched the debate live inside the Breck Cargill Theater and more than 200,000 Minnesotans watched the debate on television.

Athletics 

Breck School is part of the Independent Metro Athletic Conference in the Minnesota State High School League and has won 28 state championship titles in 10 sports. Several players from the hockey and football programs have gone on to play for Division One programs. The boys hockey team won the state championship in 2000, 2004, 2009 and 2010. The girls' hockey program was established in 1994; it won the Minnesota state consolation tournament in 2007, and second place in the state tournament in 2008 and 2010, and won the state championship in 2012, 2018, 2019, 2020.

Awards

Notable alumni 
 Frank Mars 1901, creator of the Milky Way and other candy bars
 Walter Lewis Bush, Jr. 1947, former owner of the Minnesota North Stars, member of the United States Hockey Hall of Fame, and recipient of the Olympic Order
 Richard Proudfit 1949, founder of the non-profit, Feed My Starving Children
 Stanley Hubbard 1951, Chairman and President, Hubbard Broadcasting
 Bradford Parkinson 1952, inventor of Global Positioning System (GPS) technology
 Paul Johnson 1953, gold medal Olympian and member of the United States Hockey Hall of Fame
 Lee R. Anderson, Sr. 1957, owner and chairman of Minnesota-based APi Group, Inc.
 R. T. Rybak 1974, Mayor of Minneapolis for three terms from 2002 to 2014 
 Alice Goodman 1976, poet
 Spencer Reece 1981, author and poet
 Wayne Wilderson 1984, television actor
 Erik Stolhanske 1987, actor/comedian
 Alec Soth 1988, photographer
 Craig Taborn 1988,  pianist, keyboardist and composer 
 Craig Finn 1989, frontman of the band The Hold Steady
 Marisa Coughlan 1992, actor
 Charlie Korsmo 1996, former child actor turned lawyer
 Dominique Byrd 2002, former NFL tight end
 John Curry 2002, former NHL goaltender
 Peter Mueller, center for HC Kometa Brno
 Blake Wheeler, captain and right wing for the Winnipeg Jets
 Kate Schipper 2013, forward for the Minnesota Whitecaps
 David Roddy 2019, NBA player for the Memphis Grizzlies

References

External links 
 Breck School website
 Breck School Alumni Association
 Breck School Athletics
 Breck School History at the City of Faribault Heritage Preservation Commission
 Breck School's page at the Minnesota State High School League

Educational institutions established in 1886
Private elementary schools in Minnesota
Private high schools in Minnesota
Private middle schools in Minnesota
Episcopal schools in the United States
Episcopal Church in Minnesota
Schools in Hennepin County, Minnesota
Preparatory schools in Minnesota
1886 establishments in Minnesota